June Markham is a British ice dancer. With partner Courtney Jones, she is the 1957 & 1958 World champion and European champion.

Results
(with Courtney Jones)

References

 

British female ice dancers
Year of birth missing (living people)
Living people
World Figure Skating Championships medalists
European Figure Skating Championships medalists
Sportspeople from Chester-le-Street